The 1986–87 New York Rangers season was the franchise's 61st season. During the regular season, the Rangers finished in fourth place in the Patrick Division with 76 points, and qualified for the NHL playoffs. New York was eliminated in the first round of the playoffs by the Philadelphia Flyers.

Regular season

Final standings

Schedule and results

|- align="center" bgcolor="#FFBBBB"
| 1 || 9 || New Jersey Devils || 5–3 || 0–1–0
|- align="center" bgcolor="#FFBBBB"
| 2 || 11 || @ Pittsburgh Penguins || 6–5 OT || 0–2–0
|- align="center" bgcolor="#FFBBBB"
| 3 || 13 || Washington Capitals || 7–6 OT || 0–3–0
|- align="center" bgcolor="white"
| 4 || 15 || @ Chicago Blackhawks || 5–5 OT || 0–3–1
|- align="center" bgcolor="#CCFFCC"
| 5 || 18 || @ New York Islanders || 3–2 || 1–3–1
|- align="center" bgcolor="white"
| 6 || 19 || New York Islanders || 2–2 OT || 1–3–2
|- align="center" bgcolor="#CCFFCC"
| 7 || 22 || Los Angeles Kings || 5–4 OT || 2–3–2
|- align="center" bgcolor="white"
| 8 || 25 || @ Montreal Canadiens || 3–3 OT || 2–3–3
|- align="center" bgcolor="white"
| 9 || 26 || Toronto Maple Leafs || 3–3 OT || 2–3–4
|- align="center" bgcolor="#FFBBBB"
| 10 || 29 || @ St. Louis Blues || 7–2 || 2–4–4
|-

|- align="center" bgcolor="#FFBBBB"
| 11 || 2 || Winnipeg Jets || 5–4 OT || 2–5–4
|- align="center" bgcolor="#FFBBBB"
| 12 || 5 || @ Detroit Red Wings || 5–4 OT || 2–6–4
|- align="center" bgcolor="#CCFFCC"
| 13 || 8 || @ Philadelphia Flyers || 3–2 || 3–6–4
|- align="center" bgcolor="#FFBBBB"
| 14 || 9 || @ Quebec Nordiques || 6–5 || 3–7–4
|- align="center" bgcolor="#CCFFCC"
| 15 || 12 || Buffalo Sabres || 2–1 OT || 4–7–4
|- align="center" bgcolor="#CCFFCC"
| 16 || 14 || Philadelphia Flyers || 2–1 || 5–7–4
|- align="center" bgcolor="#FFBBBB"
| 17 || 16 || Edmonton Oilers || 8–6 || 5–8–4
|- align="center" bgcolor="#FFBBBB"
| 18 || 17 || @ New Jersey Devils || 3–2 || 5–9–4
|- align="center" bgcolor="#FFBBBB"
| 19 || 19 || @ Edmonton Oilers || 5–4 OT || 5–10–4
|- align="center" bgcolor="#CCFFCC"
| 20 || 21 || @ Vancouver Canucks || 8–5 || 6–10–4
|- align="center" bgcolor="#FFBBBB"
| 21 || 22 || @ Calgary Flames || 8–5 || 6–11–4
|- align="center" bgcolor="#CCFFCC"
| 22 || 26 || Quebec Nordiques || 4–2 || 7–11–4
|- align="center" bgcolor="white"
| 23 || 29 || @ Pittsburgh Penguins || 5–5 OT || 7–11–5
|- align="center" bgcolor="white"
| 24 || 30 || Pittsburgh Penguins || 2–2 OT || 7–11–6
|-

|- align="center" bgcolor="#FFBBBB"
| 25 || 2 || @ New Jersey Devils || 8–5 || 7–12–6
|- align="center" bgcolor="#CCFFCC"
| 26 || 5 || @ Winnipeg Jets || 6–3 || 8–12–6
|- align="center" bgcolor="#CCFFCC"
| 27 || 10 || Los Angeles Kings || 5–4 || 9–12–6
|- align="center" bgcolor="#FFBBBB"
| 28 || 11 || @ Montreal Canadiens || 6–2 || 9–13–6
|- align="center" bgcolor="#CCFFCC"
| 29 || 14 || @ Washington Capitals || 3–1 || 10–13–6
|- align="center" bgcolor="#FFBBBB"
| 30 || 15 || Minnesota North Stars || 4–3 || 10–14–6
|- align="center" bgcolor="#CCFFCC"
| 31 || 17 || Washington Capitals || 6–1 || 11–14–6
|- align="center" bgcolor="#FFBBBB"
| 32 || 20 || @ New York Islanders || 5–2 || 11–15–6
|- align="center" bgcolor="#FFBBBB"
| 33 || 21 || Hartford Whalers || 4–3 OT || 11–16–6
|- align="center" bgcolor="#CCFFCC"
| 34 || 23 || New Jersey Devils || 8–5 || 12–16–6
|- align="center" bgcolor="#CCFFCC"
| 35 || 26 || @ New Jersey Devils || 7–4 || 13–16–6
|- align="center" bgcolor="#FFBBBB"
| 36 || 27 || @ St. Louis Blues || 3–2 || 13–17–6
|- align="center" bgcolor="#CCFFCC"
| 37 || 30 || @ Pittsburgh Penguins || 5–3 || 14–17–6
|- align="center" bgcolor="#CCFFCC"
| 38 || 31 || New York Islanders || 4–3 OT || 15–17–6
|-

|- align="center" bgcolor="#CCFFCC"
| 39 || 3 || @ Quebec Nordiques || 5–2 || 16–17–6
|- align="center" bgcolor="white"
| 40 || 5 || Minnesota North Stars || 3–3 OT || 16–17–7
|- align="center" bgcolor="#FFBBBB"
| 41 || 7 || Philadelphia Flyers || 6–3 || 16–18–7
|- align="center" bgcolor="#FFBBBB"
| 42 || 9 || New York Islanders || 2–1 || 16–19–7
|- align="center" bgcolor="#CCFFCC"
| 43 || 11 || Vancouver Canucks || 8–3 || 17–19–7
|- align="center" bgcolor="#FFBBBB"
| 44 || 12 || @ Boston Bruins || 4–1 || 17–20–7
|- align="center" bgcolor="#CCFFCC"
| 45 || 14 || @ Calgary Flames || 8–5 || 18–20–7
|- align="center" bgcolor="white"
| 46 || 19 || @ Los Angeles Kings || 2–2 OT || 18–20–8
|- align="center" bgcolor="#FFBBBB"
| 47 || 21 || @ Vancouver Canucks || 5–3 || 18–21–8
|- align="center" bgcolor="#FFBBBB"
| 48 || 23 || @ Edmonton Oilers || 7–4 || 18–22–8
|- align="center" bgcolor="#CCFFCC"
| 49 || 26 || New Jersey Devils || 6–3 || 19–22–8
|- align="center" bgcolor="#FFBBBB"
| 50 || 28 || Winnipeg Jets || 2–1 || 19–23–8
|- align="center" bgcolor="#CCFFCC"
| 51 || 31 || @ Philadelphia Flyers || 3–1 || 20–23–8
|-

|- align="center" bgcolor="#CCFFCC"
| 52 || 1 || Boston Bruins || 5–4 || 21–23–8
|- align="center" bgcolor="#CCFFCC"
| 53 || 4 || Washington Capitals || 3–2 || 22–23–8
|- align="center" bgcolor="#CCFFCC"
| 54 || 7 || @ Washington Capitals || 5–4 OT || 23–23–8
|- align="center" bgcolor="#FFBBBB"
| 55 || 8 || Toronto Maple Leafs || 5–4 || 23–24–8
|- align="center" bgcolor="#CCFFCC"
| 56 || 15 || Pittsburgh Penguins || 4–1 || 24–24–8
|- align="center" bgcolor="#CCFFCC"
| 57 || 17 || Detroit Red Wings || 6–2 || 25–24–8
|- align="center" bgcolor="#FFBBBB"
| 58 || 19 || @ Chicago Blackhawks || 5–2 || 25–25–8
|- align="center" bgcolor="#FFBBBB"
| 59 || 20 || Buffalo Sabres || 6–3 || 25–26–8
|- align="center" bgcolor="#FFBBBB"
| 60 || 22 || Pittsburgh Penguins || 4–2 || 25–27–8
|- align="center" bgcolor="#CCFFCC"
| 61 || 24 || @ Buffalo Sabres || 6–3 || 26–27–8
|- align="center" bgcolor="#CCFFCC"
| 62 || 25 || @ Toronto Maple Leafs || 4–2 || 27–27–8
|- align="center" bgcolor="#FFBBBB"
| 63 || 28 || @ Detroit Red Wings || 4–1 || 27–28–8
|-

|- align="center" bgcolor="#FFBBBB"
| 64 || 1 || @ Washington Capitals || 7–3 || 27–29–8
|- align="center" bgcolor="#CCFFCC"
| 65 || 4 || New York Islanders || 7–5 || 28–29–8
|- align="center" bgcolor="#FFBBBB"
| 66 || 8 || Calgary Flames || 7–4 || 28–30–8
|- align="center" bgcolor="#CCFFCC"
| 67 || 11 || Boston Bruins || 3–2 || 29–30–8
|- align="center" bgcolor="#CCFFCC"
| 68 || 12 || @ Philadelphia Flyers || 6–1 || 30–30–8
|- align="center" bgcolor="#CCFFCC"
| 69 || 14 || @ Pittsburgh Penguins || 3–2 OT || 31–30–8
|- align="center" bgcolor="#FFBBBB"
| 70 || 15 || Philadelphia Flyers || 5–2 || 31–31–8
|- align="center" bgcolor="#FFBBBB"
| 71 || 17 || @ Philadelphia Flyers || 4–1 || 31–32–8
|- align="center" bgcolor="#FFBBBB"
| 72 || 18 || Hartford Whalers || 5–3 || 31–33–8
|- align="center" bgcolor="#FFBBBB"
| 73 || 21 || @ New York Islanders || 4–3 || 31–34–8
|- align="center" bgcolor="#CCFFCC"
| 74 || 22 || Chicago Blackhawks || 5–3 || 32–34–8
|- align="center" bgcolor="#FFBBBB"
| 75 || 25 || New Jersey Devils || 8–2 || 32–35–8
|- align="center" bgcolor="#CCFFCC"
| 76 || 27 || St. Louis Blues || 6–4 || 33–35–8
|- align="center" bgcolor="#CCFFCC"
| 77 || 30 || @ Minnesota North Stars || 6–5 || 34–35–8
|-

|- align="center" bgcolor="#FFBBBB"
| 78 || 1 || Washington Capitals || 5–1 || 34–36–8
|- align="center" bgcolor="#FFBBBB"
| 79 || 4 || @ Hartford Whalers || 5–3 || 34–37–8
|- align="center" bgcolor="#FFBBBB"
| 80 || 5 || Montreal Canadiens || 8–2 || 34–38–8
|-

Playoffs

Key:  Win  Loss

Player statistics
Skaters

Goaltenders

†Denotes player spent time with another team before joining Rangers. Stats reflect time with Rangers only.
‡Traded mid-season. Stats reflect time with Rangers only.

Awards and records

Transactions

Draft picks
New York's picks at the 1986 NHL Entry Draft in Montreal, Quebec, Canada at the Montreal Forum.

Supplemental Draft
New York's picks at the 1986 NHL Supplemental Draft.

Farm teams

References

New York Rangers seasons
New York Rangers
New York Rangers
New York Rangers
New York Rangers
1980s in Manhattan
Madison Square Garden